Mariano, a masculine name from the Romance languages

Mariano may also refer to:

 Mariano (footballer, born 1975), a former Portuguese football player
 Mariano (footballer, born 1986), a Brazilian professional footballer
 Mariano (surname), an Italian surname
 Mariano Comense, town and comune in the province of Como, Lombardy, Italy